Arsov is a Bulgarian and Macedonian masculine surname, its feminine counterpart is Arsova. It may refer to:
Džordže Arsov (born 1946), Mayor of Kisela Voda, Macedonia 
Elena Arsova (born 1975), Bulgarian volleyball player
Lilcho Arsov (born 1972), Bulgarian football goalkeeper 
Ljupčo Arsov (1910–1986), Macedonian communist politician
Milan Arsov (1884–1908), Bulgarian revolutionary 
Petar Poparsov (1868–1941), Bulgarian revolutionary
Slaveyko Arsov (1877–1904), Bulgarian revolutionary
Yoncho Arsov (1929–2011), Bulgarian football player and manager 

Bulgarian-language surnames